Stenocercus guentheri, Günther's whorltail iguana, is a species of lizard of the Tropiduridae family. It is found in Colombia and Ecuador.

References

Stenocercus
Reptiles described in 1885
Reptiles of Colombia
Reptiles of Ecuador
Taxa named by George Albert Boulenger